The Tibetan people are an East Asian ethnic group native to Tibet. Their current population is estimated to be around 6.7 million. In addition to the majority living in Tibet Autonomous Region of China, significant numbers of Tibetans live in the Chinese provinces of Gansu, Qinghai, Sichuan, and Yunnan, as well as in India, Nepal, and Bhutan.

The Tibetic languages belong to the Tibeto-Burman language group. The traditional or mythological explanation of the Tibetan people's origin is that they are the descendants of the human Pha Trelgen Changchup Sempa and rock ogress Ma Drag Sinmo. It is thought that most of the Tibeto-Burman speakers in southwest China, including Tibetans, are direct descendants from the ancient Qiang people.

Most Tibetans practice Tibetan Buddhism, although some observe the indigenous Bon religion and there is a small Muslim minority. Tibetan Buddhism influences Tibetan art, drama and architecture, while the harsh geography of Tibet has produced an adaptive culture of Tibetan medicine and cuisine.

Demographics
As of the 2014 Census, there are about 6 million Tibetans living in the Tibet Autonomous Region and the 10 Tibetan autonomous prefectures in the provinces of Gansu, Qinghai, Sichuan, and Yunnan. The SIL Ethnologue in 2009 documents an additional 189,000 Tibetic speakers living in India, 5,280 in Nepal and 4,800 in Bhutan. The Central Tibetan Administration's (CTA) Green Book (of the Tibetan Government in Exile) counts 145,150 Tibetans outside Tibet: a little over 100,000 in India; over 16,000 in Nepal; over 1,800 in Bhutan, and over 25,000 in other parts of the world. There are Tibetan communities in the United States, Australia, Brazil, Canada, Costa Rica, France, Mexico, Norway, Mongolia, Germany, Switzerland and the United Kingdom. In the Baltistan region of Northern Pakistan, the Balti people are a Muslim ethnicity of Tibetan descent numbering around 300,000.

There is some dispute over the current and historical number of Tibetans. The Central Tibetan Administration claims that the 5.4 million number is a decrease from 6.3 million in 1959 while the Chinese government claims that it is an increase from 2.7 million in 1954. However, the question depends on the definition and extent of "Tibet"; the region claimed by the CTA is more expansive and China more diminutive. Also, the Tibetan administration did not take a formal census of its territory in the 1950s; the numbers provided by the administration at the time were "based on informed guesswork".

PRC officials attribute growth of the Tibetan population to the improved quality of health and lifestyle of the average Tibetan since the beginning of Chinese governance in Tibet. According to Chinese sources, the death rate of women in childbirth dropped from 5,000 per 100,000 in 1951 to 174.78 per 100,000 in 2010, the infant mortality rate dropped from 430 infant deaths per 1,000 in 1951 to 20.69 per 1,000 by the year of 2010 (infant mortality in China as a whole was officially rated at 14 per 1,000 in 2010). The average life expectancy for Tibetans rose from 35.5 years in 1951 to over 67 years by the end of 2010.

In China

According to the Sixth National Population Census of the People's Republic of China (2010), there are 6,282,187 Tibetans nationwide:

There are 2,716,388 people in the Tibet Autonomous Region, 1,496,524 people in Sichuan Province, 1,375,059 people in Qinghai Province, 488,359 people in Gansu Province (mostly in Gannan Tibetan Autonomous Prefecture and Bairi Tibetan Autonomous County) and 142,257 people in Yunnan Province (mostly in Diqing Tibetan Autonomous Prefecture). Tibetans account for 0.47% of the total population of the country. Tibetans account for 90.48% of the total population in Tibet Region, 24.44% of the total population of Qinghai and 1.86% of the total population in Sichuan.
 	
Of all Tibetans in China, 315,622 people live in cities, 923,177 in towns, and 5,043,388 people (80.3%) live in rural areas.

In India
In India Tibetic people are found in the regions of Ladakh (Ladakhi and Balti), Kinnaur district in Himachal Pradesh, Spiti valley, Uttarakhand (Bhotiya), Sikkim (Bhutia), and Arunachal Pradesh (Khamba, Lhoba Delhi-Majnu ka tilla and Monpa people). There are also nearly 100,000 Tibetans living in exile in India since 1959. The majority of them living in Tibetan enclaves such as Dharamshala and Bylakuppe.

In Nepal
Tibetans are known as Bhotiyas in Nepal, where they are majority in regions such as Upper Mustang, Dolpo, Walung region and Limi valley. Nepal is also home to other Tibetic people such as the Sherpa and Thakali. There are also more than 10,000 Tibetan refugees in Nepal.

Language

The Tibetic languages are a cluster of mutually unintelligible Sino-Tibetan languages spoken by approximately 8 million people, primarily Tibetan, living across a wide area of East and South Asia, including the Tibetan Plateau and Baltistan, Ladakh, Nepal, Sikkim, and Bhutan. Classical Tibetan is a major regional literary language, particularly for its use in Buddhist literature.

The Central Tibetan language (the dialects of Ü-Tsang, including Lhasa), Khams Tibetan, and Amdo Tibetan are generally considered to be dialects of a single language, especially since they all share the same literary language, while Dzongkha, Sikkimese, Sherpa, and Ladakhi are generally considered to be separate languages.

Although some of the Qiang peoples of Kham are classified by China as ethnic Tibetans, the Qiangic languages are not Tibetic, but rather form their own branch of the Sino-Tibetan language family.

Ethnic origins

Genetics 

Modern Tibetan populations are genetically most similar to other modern East Asian populations. They show relatively more genetic affinity for modern Central Asian than modern Siberian populations. They also share genetic affinity for South Asians.

Tibetan people are genetically most closely related to Han Chinese, Bhutanese. Tibetans predominantly belong to the paternal lineage O-M175. Another study by Yang et al. 2017 found that Tibetans are genetically closely related to other Sino-Tibetan populations.

Released in 2010 by University of California, Berkeley, a study identified more than 30 genetic factors that make Tibetans' bodies well-suited for high-altitudes, including EPAS1, referred to as the "super-athlete gene" which regulates the body's production of hemoglobin, allowing for greater efficiency in the use of oxygen. The genetic basis of Tibetan adaptations have been attributed to a mutation in the EPAS1 gene, and has become prevalent in the past 3,000 years. In fact, according to Rasmus Nielsen, UC Berkeley professor of integrative biology, this is "the fastest genetic change ever observed in humans".

Genetic studies shows that many of the Sherpa people have allele frequencies which are often found in other Tibeto-Burman regions, in tested genes, the strongest affinity was for Tibetan population sample studies done in the Tibet Autonomous Region. Genetically, the Sherpa cluster closest with the sample Tibetan and Han populations. Additionally, the Sherpa had exhibited affinity for several Nepalese populations, with the strongest for the Rai people, followed by the Magars and the Tamang.

Recent research into the ability of Tibetans' metabolism to function normally in the oxygen-deficient atmosphere above  shows that, although Tibetans living at high altitudes have no more oxygen in their blood than other people, they have ten times more nitric oxide and double the forearm blood flow of low-altitude dwellers. Tibetans inherited this adaptation due to their Denisovan admixture. Nitric oxide causes dilation of blood vessels, allowing blood to flow more freely to the extremities and aids the release of oxygen to tissues.

Modern Tibetans formed from Ancient Tibetan Highlanders (also known as "East Asian Highlanders") native to the Tibetan Plateau and a region up to the southern Altai Mountains, and from East Asian lowland farmers expanding from the Yellow River. Although "East Asian Highlanders" (associated with haplogroup D1) are closely related to East Asian lowland farmers (associated with haplogroup O), they form a divergent sister branch to them. A 2019 study by Wang et al., published in the journal Nature, similarly concluded that modern Tibetans (and closely related Tibeto-Burmese) formed from "East Asian Highlanders" and agriculturalists from the Yellow river. They further found evidence for geneflow from this ancient "East Asian Highlanders" into some populations in Southeast Asia and Japan. By comparing Tibetans to modern worldwide populations it was found that Tibetans are very closely related to other East Asians, especially Chinese and Japanese respectively. Geneflow from Tibetan-like ancestry into West Asia and Northeastern Africa was also found, however this may be caused by relative small sample size from these regions.

Mythology
According to Tibetan mythology, the origins of Tibetans are said to be rooted in the marriage of the monkey Pha Trelgen Changchup Sempa and rock ogress Ma Drag Sinmo.

Religion 

Most Tibetans generally observe Tibetan Buddhism or a collection of native traditions known as Bön (also absorbed into mainstream Tibetan Buddhism). There is a minority Tibetan Muslim population. There is also a small Tibetan Christian population in the eastern Tibet and northwestern Yunnan of China. Also there are some Tibetan Hindus who mainly live in China, India and Nepal.

According to legend, the 28th king of Tibet, Thothori Nyantsen, dreamed of a sacred treasure falling from heaven, which contained a Buddhist sutra, mantras, and religious objects. However, because the Tibetan script had not been invented, the text could not be translated in writing and no one initially knew what was written in it. Buddhism did not take root in Tibet until the reign of Songtsän Gampo, who married two Buddhist princesses, Bhrikuti of Nepal and Wencheng of China. It then gained popularity when Padmasambhāva visited Tibet at the invitation of the 38th Tibetan king, Trisong Deutson.

Today, one can see Tibetans placing Mani stones prominently in public places. Tibetan lamas, both Buddhist and Bön, play a major role in the lives of the Tibetan people, conducting religious ceremonies and taking care of the monasteries. Pilgrims plant prayer flags over sacred grounds as a symbol of good luck.

The prayer wheel is a means of simulating the chant of a mantra by physically revolving the object several times in a clockwise direction. It is widely seen among Tibetan people. In order not to desecrate religious artifacts such as Stupas, mani stones, and Gompas, Tibetan Buddhists walk around them in a clockwise direction, although the reverse direction is true for Bön. Tibetan Buddhists chant the prayer "Om mani padme hum", while the practitioners of Bön chant "Om matri muye sale du".

Culture

Tibet is rich in culture. Tibetan festivals such as Losar, Shoton, Linka, and the Bathing Festival are deeply rooted in indigenous religion and also contain foreign influences. Each person takes part in the Bathing Festival three times: at birth, at marriage, and at death.

Art
Tibetan art is deeply religious in nature, from the exquisitely detailed statues found in Gonpas to wooden carvings and the intricate designs of the Thangka paintings. Tibetan art can be found in almost every object and every aspect of daily life.

Thangka paintings, a syncretism of Indian scroll-painting with Nepalese and Kashmiri painting, appeared in Tibet around the 8th century. Rectangular and painted on cotton or linen, they usually depict traditional motifs including religious, astrological, and theological subjects, and sometimes a mandala. To ensure that the image will not fade, organic and mineral pigments are added, and the painting is framed in colorful silk brocades.

Drama
Tibetan folk opera, known as lhamo, is a combination of dances, chants and songs. The repertoire is drawn from Buddhist stories and Tibetan history.

Tibetan opera was founded in the fourteenth century by Thang Tong Gyalpo, a lama and a bridge-builder. Gyalpo and seven girls he recruited organized the first performance to raise funds for building bridges to facilitate transportation in Tibet. The tradition continued uninterrupted for nearly seven hundred years, and performances are held on various festive occasions such as the Lingka and Shoton festival. The performance is usually a drama, held on a barren stage that combines dances, chants, and songs. Colorful masks are sometimes worn to identify a character, with red symbolizing a king and yellow indicating deities and lamas. The performance starts with a stage purification and blessings. A narrator then sings a summary of the story, and the performance begins. Another ritual blessing is conducted at the end of the play. There are also many historical myths/epics written by high lamas about the reincarnation of a "chosen one" who will do great things.

Architecture
The most unusual feature of Tibetan architecture is that many of the houses and monasteries are built on elevated, sunny sites facing the south. They are commonly made of a mixture of rocks, wood, cement and earth. Little fuel is available for heating or lighting, so flat roofs are built to conserve heat, and multiple windows are constructed to let in sunlight. Walls are usually sloped inwards at 10 degrees as a precaution against frequent earthquakes in the mountainous area. Tibetan homes and buildings are white-washed on the outside, and beautifully decorated inside.

Formerly the residence of the Dalai Lama, it contains over a thousand rooms within thirteen stories and houses portraits of the past Dalai Lamas and statues of the Buddha. It is divided between the outer White Palace, which serves as the administrative quarters, and the inner Red Quarters, which houses the assembly hall of the Lamas, chapels, 10,000 shrines, and a vast library of Buddhist scriptures.

Medicine
Traditional Tibetan medicine utilizes up to two thousand types of plants, forty animal species, and fifty minerals. One of the key figures in its development was the renowned 8th century physician Yuthog Yontan Gonpo, who produced the Four Medical Tantras integrating material from the medical traditions of Persia, India and China. The tantras contained a total of 156 chapters in the form of Thangkas, which tell about the archaic Tibetan medicine and the essences of medicines in other places.

Yutok Yonten Gonpo's descendant, Yuthok Sarma Yonten Gonpo, further consolidated the tradition by adding eighteen medical works. One of his books includes paintings depicting the resetting of a broken bone. In addition, he compiled a set of anatomical pictures of internal organs.

Cuisine

The Cuisine of Tibet reflects the rich heritage of the country and people's adaptation to high altitude and religious culinary restrictions. The most important crop is barley. Dough made from barley flour, called tsampa, is the staple food of Tibet. This is either rolled into noodles or made into steamed dumplings called momos. Meat dishes are likely to be yak, goat or mutton, often dried or cooked into a spicy stew with potatoes. Mustard seed is cultivated in Tibet and therefore features heavily in its cuisine. Yak yogurt, butter and cheese are frequently eaten and well-prepared yogurt is considered something of a prestige item.

Clothing

Many Tibetans wear their hair long, although in recent times due to Chinese influence, most men do crop their hair short. The women braid their hair into multiple tiny braids called "Rhe-Ba" or just simply put their hair up in a braid or pony-tail in more rural areas. In more urban areas, women wear many different kinds of hairstyles such as pony-tails, braids, buns or just leaving it down.

Some men and women wear long thick dresses (chuba) in more traditional and rural regions. The men wear a shorter version with pants underneath. The style of the clothing varies between regions. Nomads often wear thick sheepskin versions. In more urban places like Lhasa, men and women dress in modern clothing, and many choose to wear chuba during festivals and holidays like Losar.

Literature

Tibet has national literature that has both religious, semi-spiritual and secular elements. While the religious texts are well-known, Tibet is also home to the semi-spiritual Gesar Epic, which is the longest epic in the world and is popular throughout Mongolia and Central Asia. There are secular texts such as The Dispute Between Tea and Chang (Tibetan beer) and Khache Phalu's Advice.

Marriage customs

Monogamy is common throughout Tibet. Marriages are sometimes arranged by the parents if the son or daughter has not picked their own partner by a certain age. However, polyandry is practiced in parts of Tibet. This is usually done to avoid division of property and provide financial security.

List of Tibetan states
Zhangzhung Kingdom (500 BC–625)
Yarlung Dynasty (?–618) (semi-mythological)
Tibetan Empire (618–842)
Kingdom of Bumthang (7th century–17th century)
Guge Kingdom (842–1630)
Purang Kingdom
Maryul (930–1500) 
Tsongkha Kingdom (997–1099) (Amdo)
Phagmodrupa Dynasty (1354–1618) (Ü-Tsang)
Maqpon kingdom (1190–1846) (Baltistan)
Rinpungpa Dynasty (1435–1565) (Tsang)
Yabgo Dynasty (before 1500-1972) (Baltistan)
Tsangpa Dynasty (1565–1642) (Tsang)
Ganden Phodrang (1642–1959)
Namgyal Dynasty (1460–1842) (Ladakh)
Chogyal Namgyal dynasty of Sikkim (1642–1975)
Tibet (1912–1951)

Kingdoms of Kham
Nyagrong Kingdom (?–1865)
Kingdom of Powo (?–1928)
Nangcheng Kingdom (?–1928)
Litang Kingdom (?–1950)
Kingdom of Lingtsang (12th century–1950)
Kingdom of Derge (15th century–1956)
Hor States (Horpa)
Chiefdom of Bathang

Gyalrong Kingdoms
Kingdom of Chakla (1407–1950) 
Chiefdom of Chuchen
Chiefdom of Tsanlha

See also

History of Tibet
Timeline of Tibetan history
Flag of Tibet
Sumpa
Upper Mustang
Sherpa people
Baima people 
Balti people
Bhotias and Bhutia
Burig
Lepcha people
Limbu people
Lhoba people
Monpa Tibetan
Thakali people
Changpa people
Golok people
Wutun people 
Tibetan Muslims
Tibetan diaspora
Tibetan Americans
Central Tibetan Administration
Tibetan independence movement
Anti-Tibetan Sentiment

References

Citations

Sources 

 
 Goldstein, Melvyn C., "Study of the Family structure in Tibet", Natural History, March 1987: 109–112. ( on the Internet Archive).
 Stein, R.A. (1972). Tibetan Civilization. J.E. Stapleton Driver (trans.). Stanford University Press.  (paper); .
 Su, Bing, et al. "Y chromosome haplotypes reveal prehistorical migrations to the Himalayas". Human Genetics 107, 2000: 582–590.

External links 

 Imaging Everest: article on Tibetan people at the time of early mountaineering from the Royal Geographical Society
 Tibetan costume from china.org.cn
 Rukor where the world discusses the fate of the nomads
 Map share of ethnic by county of China

 
Ethnic groups officially recognized by China
Indigenous peoples of East Asia
Tibet